The Sanremo Music Festival 1962 was the 12th annual Sanremo Music Festival, held at the Sanremo Casino in Sanremo, province of Imperia between 8 and 18 February 1962.

Gianni Ravera served as artistic director.
  
According to the rules of this edition every song was performed in a double performance by a couple of singers or groups. The winners of the Festival were Domenico Modugno and Claudio Villa with the song "Addio, addio".

Participants and results

References 

Sanremo Music Festival by year
1962 in Italian music
1962 in music
1962 music festivals